A shooting schedule is a project plan of each day's shooting for a film production. It is normally created and managed by the assistant director, who reports to the production manager managing the production schedule. Both schedules represent a timeline stating where and when production resources are used.

References

External links
 Online sample pages of shooting schedule for "Poltergeist"
 Online sample pages of shooting schedule for "Orlando"

Film production
Television terminology